The Mont Pelerin Society (MPS) is an international organization composed of economists, philosophers, historians, intellectuals and business leaders. The members see the MPS as an effort to interpret in modern terms the fundamental principles of economic society as expressed by classical Western economists, political scientists and philosophers. Its founders included Friedrich Hayek, Frank Knight, Karl Popper, Ludwig von Mises, George Stigler and Milton Friedman. The society advocates freedom of expression, free market economic policies and the political values of an open society. Further, the society seeks to discover ways in which the private sector can replace many functions currently provided by government entities.

Aims 
In its "Statement of Aims" on 8 April 1947, the scholars were worried about the dangers faced by civilization, stating the following:

The group also stated that it is "difficult to imagine a society in which freedom may be effectively preserved" without the "diffused power and initiative" associated with "private property and the competitive market" and found it desirable inter alia to study the following matters:
 "The analysis and exploration of the nature of the present crisis so as to bring home to others its essential moral and economic origins.
 The redefinition of the functions of the state so as to distinguish more clearly between the totalitarian and the liberal order.
 Methods of re-establishing the rule of law and of assuring its development in such manner that individuals and groups are not in a position to encroach upon the freedom of others and private rights are not allowed to become a basis of predatory power.
 The possibility of establishing minimum standards by means not inimical to initiative and functioning of the market.
 Methods of combating the misuse of history for the furtherance of creeds hostile to liberty.
 The problem of the creation of an international order conducive to the safeguarding of peace and liberty and permitting the establishment of harmonious international economic relations."

The group "seeks to establish no meticulous and hampering orthodoxy", "conduct propaganda" or align with some party. It aims to facilitate "the exchange of views [...] to contribute to the preservation and improvement of the free society."

Name 
The MPS was created in Fall 1947 at a conference organized by Friedrich Von Hayek during the International Trade Organization (ITO) drama of that year. As ITO delegates met in Geneva, Switzerland to draft the world trade charter, another group of intellectuals convened at the opposite end of the lake at the base of Mont Pèlerin. Taking their name from the location, the Mont Pèlerin Society was formally established on April 10, 1947.

Originally, it was to be named the Acton-Tocqueville Society. Frank Knight protested against naming the group after two "Roman Catholic aristocrats," and Ludwig von Mises expressed concern that the mistakes made by Acton and Tocqueville would be connected with the society.

History 
In 1947, thirty-nine scholars, mostly economists with some historians and philosophers, were invited by Friedrich Hayek to meet to discuss the state and possible fate of classical liberalism, his goal being an organization which would resist interventionism and promote his conception of classical liberalism. He wanted to discuss how to combat the "state ascendancy and Marxist or Keynesian planning [that was] sweeping the globe". The first meeting took place in the Hotel du Parc in the Swiss village of Mont Pèlerin, near the city of Vevey, Switzerland. Funding for the conference came from various sources including the William Volker Fund thanks to Harold Luhnow and the Bank of England owing to the help of Alfred Suenson-Taylor. William Rappard, a Swiss academic, diplomat and founder of the Graduate Institute of International Studies, addressed the society's inaugural meeting. In his "Opening Address to a Conference at Mont Pelerin", Hayek mentioned "two men with whom I had most fully discussed the plan for this meeting both have not lived to see its realisation", namely Henry Simons (who trained Milton Friedman, a future president of the MPS, at the University of Chicago) and John Clapham, a British economic historian.

The MPS aimed to "facilitate an exchange of ideas between like-minded scholars in the hope of strengthening the principles and practice of a free society and to study the workings, virtues, and defects of market-oriented economic systems". The MPS has continued to meet regularly, the General Meeting every two years and the regional meetings annually. The MPS has close ties to the network of think tanks sponsored in part by the Atlas Economic Research Foundation.

Influence 
Hayek stressed that the society was to be a scholarly community arguing against collectivism while not engaging in public relations or propaganda. The society has become part of an international think tank movement and Hayek used it as a forum to encourage members such as Antony Fisher to pursue the think tank route. Fisher has established the Institute of Economic Affairs (IEA) in London during 1955, the Manhattan Institute for Policy Research in New York City in 1977 and the Atlas Economic Research Foundation in 1981. Now known as the Atlas Network, they support a wide network of think tanks, including the Fraser Institute.

Prominent MPS members who advanced to policy positions included the late Chancellor Ludwig Erhard of West Germany, President Luigi Einaudi of Italy, Chairman Arthur F. Burns of the Federal Reserve Board and Secretary of State George Shultz. Among prominent contemporary political figures, former President Václav Klaus of the Czech Republic and acting politicians, such as Prime Minister Ranil Wickremasinghe of Sri Lanka, former Chancellor of the Exchequer Sir Geoffrey Howe of the United Kingdom, former Italian Minister of Foreign Affairs and Minister of Defence Antonio Martino, Chilean Finance Minister Carlos Cáceres and former New Zealand Finance Minister Ruth Richardson, are all  MPS members. Of 76 economic advisers on Ronald Reagan's 1980 campaign staff, 22 were MPS members.

Several leading journalists, including Pulitzer Prize-winning columnist Walter Lippmann, former radical Max Eastman (then roving editor at Reader's Digest), John Chamberlain (former editorial writer for Life magazine), Henry Hazlitt (former financial editor of The New York Times and columnist for Newsweek), John Davenport (holder of editorial posts at Fortune and Barron's) and Felix Morley (Pulitzer Prize-winning editor at The Washington Post), have also been members. Members of the MPS have also been well represented on the Committee for the Prize in Economic Sciences in Memory of Alfred Nobel.

Eight MPS members, Friedrich Hayek, Milton Friedman, George Stigler, Maurice Allais, James M. Buchanan, Ronald Coase, Gary Becker and Vernon Smith have won the Nobel Memorial Prize in Economic Sciences. Graeme Maxton and Jørgen Randers note that it is no surprise that so many MPS members have won a Nobel Memorial Prize in Economic Sciences because the MPS helped to create that award, specifically to legitimize free-market economic thinking.

In the 2014 Global Go To Think Tank Index Report (Think Tanks and Civil Societies Program, University of Pennsylvania), the MPS is noted as having the 9th (out of 55) "Best Think Tank Conference".

In 2018, the Swiss blockchain banking Fintech company Mt Pelerin has named itself after the Mont Pelerin Society as an hommage to the values that the organization advocates.

Past presidents 
Numerous notable economists have served as president of the MPS:

 Friedrich Hayek – United Kingdom, 1947–1961
 Wilhelm Röpke – Switzerland, 1961–1962
 John Jewkes – United Kingdom, 1962–1964
 Friedrich A. Lutz – Germany, 1964–1967
 Bruno Leoni – Italy, 1967–1968
 Günter Schmölders – Germany, 1968–1970
 Milton Friedman – United States, 1970–1972
 Arthur Shenfield – United Kingdom, 1972–1974
 Gaston Leduc – France, 1974–1976
 George Stigler – United States, 1976–1978
 Manuel Ayau – Guatemala, 1978–1980
 Chiaki Nishiyama – Japan, 1980–1982
 Lord Harris of High Cross – United Kingdom, 1982–1984
 James M. Buchanan – United States, 1984–1986
 Herbert Giersch – Germany, 1986–1988
 Antonio Martino – Italy, 1988–1990
 Gary Becker – United States, 1990–1992
 Max Hartwell – United Kingdom, 1992–1994
 Pascal Salin – France, 1994–1996
 Edwin Feulner – United States, 1996–1998
 Ramón Díaz – Uruguay, 1998–2000
 Christian Watrin – Germany, 2000–2002
 Leonard P. Liggio – United States, 2002–2004
 Victoria Curzon-Price – Switzerland, 2004–2006
 Greg Lindsay – Australia, 2006–2008
 Deepak Lal – United States, 2008–2010
 Kenneth Minogue – United Kingdom, 2010–2012
 Allan H. Meltzer – United States, 2012–2014
 Pedro Schwartz – Spain, 2014–2016
 Peter Boettke – United States, 2016–2018
 John B. Taylor – United States, 2018–2020
 Linda Whetstone – United Kingdom, 2020–2021
 Gabriel Calzada – Spain, 2021–

Other notable participants 

 Maurice Allais – French physicist and economist
 Karl Brandt – German-American agricultural economist
 Götz Briefs –  German economist
 Aaron Director – professor at the University of Chicago Law School
 Ludwig Erhard – Minister of Economics and Chancellor of postwar West Germany
 Frank Graham – American economist
 F. A. Harper – American economist
 Henry Hazlitt – American journalist
 Trygve Hoff – Norwegian economist and journalist
 Bertrand de Jouvenel – French philosopher and political economist
 Václav Klaus – Czech economist and politician
 Frank Knight – Chicago school economist
 Fritz Machlup – Austrian-American economist
 Salvador de Madariaga – Spanish diplomat and writer
 Loren Miller – American civic reformer and libertarian activist
 Ludwig von Mises – Austrian economist
 Felix Morley – American journalist
 Michael Polanyi – Hungarian/British chemist, economist and philosopher of science
 Karl Popper – Austrian/British philosopher
 William Rappard – American academic and diplomat
 Leonard Read – American founder of the Foundation for Economic Education
 Lionel Robbins – British economist
 Bellikoth Raghunath Shenoy – Indian economist
 Herbert Tingsten – Swedish political scientist and journalist
 Cicely Wedgwood – British historian

Other noted members 

 Armen Alchian
 Martin Anderson (economist)
 John A. Baden
 Danny Julian Boggs
 Rhodes Boyson
 William L. Breit
 Yaron Brook
 William F. Buckley Jr.
 Steven N. S. Cheung
 Warren Coats
 Harold Demsetz
 Donald J. Devine
 Ross Eckert
 John Exter
 David D. Friedman
 Hannes Hólmsteinn Gissurarson
 Otto von Habsburg
 Ronald Hamowy
 Steven F. Hayward
 George Hilton
 Israel Kirzner
 Charles G. Koch
 Peter Kurrild-Klitgaard
 Henri Lepage
 Leon Louw
 Henry Maksoud
 Henry Manne
 Paul McCracken
 Marcel van Meerhaeghe
 Ernst-Joachim Mestmäcker
 Maurice Newman
 John O'Sullivan
 J. Howard Pew
 William H. Peterson
 Madsen Pirie
 Carlos Cáceres Contreras
 Richard Posner
 Enoch Powell
 Alvin Rabushka
 Richard W. Rahn
 Alan Reynolds
 Ljubo Sirc
 Lowell C. Smith
 Beryl W. Sprinkel
 Gordon Tullock
 Mario Vargas Llosa
 Leland B. Yeager

See also 

 Colloque Walter Lippmann
 Neoliberalism

References

Further reading 
 R. M. Hartwell (1995). A History of the Mont Pèlerin Society. Indianapolis: Liberty Fund. . .
 Hans Otto Lenel (1996). ORDO: Jahrbuch für die Ordnung von Wirtschaft und Gesellschaft, vol. 47, pp. 399–402. .
 Robert Higgs (Spring 1997). "Fifty Years of the Mont Pèlerin Society."  Independent Review, vol. 1, no. 4, pp. 623–625.
 Philip Plickert (2008). Wandlungen des Neoliberalismus. Eine Studie zu Entwicklung und Ausstrahlung der Mont Pèlerin Society | Changes in Neoliberalism: A Study on the Development and Charisma of the Mont Pèlerin Society. Stuttgart: Lucius & Lucius. . . Preview.
 Reviewed: Marcus M. Payk (November 23, 2009). Archiv für Sozialgeschichte (AfS).
 Philip Mirowski & Dieter Plehwe (editors) (2009). The Road from Mont Pèlerin: The Making of the Neoliberal Thought Collective. Harvard University Press. . . .
 
 Reviewed:Kaza, Greg (March 30, 2010). Washington Times.
 Angus Burgin (2012). The Great Persuasion: Reinventing Free Markets Since the Depression. Cambridge, MA: Harvard University Press. . . Preview.
 Reviewed: Liggio, Leonard (Fall 2013). Independent Review, vol. 18, no. 2, pp. 298–301. Independent Institute. .
 Daniel Stedman Jones (2012). Masters of the Universe: Hayek, Friedman, and the Birth of Neoliberal Politics. Princeton University Press. .

External links 
 Official website
 Organization profile at DeSmogBlog
 Organization profile at National Center for Charitable Statistics (Urban Institute)
 Mont Pèlerin Society (1947–…): Inventory of the General Meeting Files (1947–1998). Preface by Jacques Van Offelen. Belgium: Liberaal Archief (2004). Archived.
 Guide to the Mont Pelerin Society Records and sound recordings of meetings online at the Hoover Institution Archives

1947 establishments in Switzerland
Think tanks established in 1947
Classical liberalism
Political and economic think tanks based in Europe
Libertarian think tanks
Libertarianism in Switzerland
Neoliberal organizations